Edward Marten was Dean of Worcester from 1746 until his death on 8 October 1751.

He was born in Twickenham. Previously a Canon of St George's Chapel, Windsor and St Paul's, he was also Master of St Oswald's Hospital, Worcester.

References

People from Twickenham
1751 deaths
Deans of Worcester
Year of birth unknown
Canons of Windsor